The Lavangsdalen bus accident was a bus crash in Northern Norway on 7 January 2011.

On the European route E8, a car headed north towards Tromsø was about to pass a bus headed south towards Nordkjosbotn, but entered the opposing lane and crashed into the bus. The bus rotated into a horizontal position, and other vehicles subsequently slammed into the bus. Five persons were killed.

References

2011 in Norway
2011 road incidents in Europe
Bus incidents in Norway